The Malaysian Trades Union Congress, abbreviated MTUC, is a national trade union centre in Malaysia. It was formed in 1949 and was originally known as the Malayan Trades Union Council. It then changed its name to the Malayan Trades Union Congress in 1958, and then to its current name with the formation of Malaysia.

MTUC is affiliated with the International Trade Union Confederation.

Working Committee office bearers

2022-2025
President:
Mohd Effendy Bin Abdul Ghani (UPCW)
Deputy President:
Matkar Bin Siwang (FIEU)
Secretary General:
Kamarul Baharin bin Mansor (NUMW)
Deputy Secretary General:
Mohd Khairi bin Man (EIWU)
Financial Secretary:
Wang Heng Suang (NUTP)
Deputy Financial Secretary:
Ng Choo Seong (ABOM)
Vice President (Private Sector):
Mohamad Dauzkaply Nor bin Ghazali (KEPAIM)
Shatiri bin Mansor (CANON OPTO)
Dzulkernain bin Hassan (KPPPTNB)
A. Balasubramaniam (UNEPASS)
Mohd Rais Hafizuddin bin Adnan (PERODUA)
Mohd Khairul bin Buyang @ Buang (KPPIT)
Michelle Cheow Yee Pin (Pentadbiran Insurans)
Vice President (Public Sector):
Aminuddin bin Awang (NUTP)
Norhayati Abdul Rashid (MNU)
Asman bin Mohd Nawawi (AUEGCAS)
Vice President (Statutory Body):
Alwi Shakir bin Abdullah (Kesatuan Pekerja-Pekerja Tourism Malaysia)
Basharuddin bin Harun (KKAPPUM)
Mazmir bin Mohd Amin (UMGSU)
Vice President (Women’s Committee):
Nasrifah Binti Sukarni (NUPCIW)
Vice President (Youth Chairman) :
Mohd Sazuan bin Abdul Hadi (Kesatuan Kakitangan PERKESO)

Past leadership

Affiliates

Agriculture
 All Malayan Estates Staff Union (AMESU)
 Kesatuan Kakitangan Jabatan Pertanian Sarawak
 Kesatuan Pekerja-pekerja FELDA
 Kesatuan Pekerja-pekerja Lembaga Kemajuan Ikan Malaysia
 Sabah Plantation Industry Employees Union
 Sabah Rubber Fund Board Employees Union
 Association of Agricultural Executives Sabah
 Kesatuan Pekerja-pekerja Felda Plantations Sdn. Bhd.
 Kesatuan Pekerja-pekerja Jabatan Hutan Sarawak
 Kesatuan Pekerja-pekerja Felda Rubber Products Sdn. Bhd.
 Kesatuan Eksekutif Felcra Bhd.
 Kesatuan Pekerja-pekerja Sabah Forest Industry
 Association Shell Oilfields Supervisory and Specialist Staff Union

Mining and Petroleum
 Kesatuan Kakitangan Petroleum Nasional Bhd (Petronas) Sarawak
 Kesatuan Kebangsaan Pekerja-pekerja Lombong Semenanjung Malaysia
 Kesatuan Pekerja-pekerja Esso Production Malaysia Inc.
 Kesatuan Pekerja-pekerja Kumpulan Shell Semenanjung Malaysia
 Sabah Mining Employees Union
 Sabah Petroleum Industry Workers Union
 Sarawak Petroleum Industry Workers Union
 Sarawak Shell Employees Union
 Sarawak Shell Oilfields Supervisory and Specialist Staff Union

Electricity and Water
 Kesatuan Kakitangan Lembaga Air Melaka
 Kesatuan Kakitangan Pihak Berkuasa Air Pulau Pinang
 Kesatuan Kakitangan Puncak Niaga (M) Sdn. Bhd.
 Kesatuan Sekerja Lembaga Air Sibu
 Sabah Water Industry Employees Union
 Sarawak Electricity Supply Corporation Employees Union
 TNB Junior Officers Union
 Kesatuan Pekerja-pekerja Indah Water Konsortium Sdn. Bhd.
 Kesatuan Eksekutif Syarikat Puncak Niaga (M) Sdn. Bhd.
 Kesatuan Jurutera-jurutera Sabah Electricity Sdn. Bhd.
 Kesatuan Pekerja-pekerja SAJ Holdings Sdn. Bhd.
 Kesatuan Percantuman Pekerja-pekerja Tenaga Nasional Bhd.
 Persatuan Eksekutif Tenaga Nasional Bhd.

Commerce, Banking and Finance
 Association of Bank Officers Malaysia
 Association of Hong Kong Bank Officers
 Association of Maybank Class One Officers
 Association of Maybank Executives
 Kesatuan Kakitangan Angkatan Koperasi Kebangsaan Malaysia Bhd. (KESUKA)
 Kesatuan Kakitangan Eksekutif Bank of Commerce (M) Bhd.
 Kesatuan Pegawai-pegawai Bank Muamalat (M) Bhd.
 Kesatuan Sekerja Kakitangan Bank Kerjasama Rakyat Malaysia Berhad
 National Union of Bank Employees
 National Union of Commercial Workers
 Sabah Banking Employees Union
 Sabah Commercial Employees Union
 Sarawak Bank Employees Union
 Kesatuan Pegawai-pegawai Bank Sabah
 Kesatuan Kakitangan Bank Simpanan Nasional
 Persatuan Pegawai-pegawai Pentadbiran Industri Insurans

Construction
 Union Of Employees in the Construction Industry

Manufacturing
 Cement Industry Employees Union
 Chemical Workers Union of Malaya
 DMIB Employees Union
 DMIB Management Staff Association
 Drink Manufacturing Industry Employees Union, Sarawak
 Electrical Industry Workers Unions
 F&NCC Beverages Sdn. Bhd. Executive Staff Union
 Johore Textile and Garment Workers
 Kesatuan Kakitangan Espek Sdn. Bhd.
 Kesatuan Kakitangan Perak – Hanjoong Simen Sdn. Bhd.
 Kesatuan Kakitangan Percetakan Keselamatan Nasional Berhad
 Kesatuan Pekerja MTC
 Kesatuan Pekerja-pekerja Perodua
 Kesatuan Pekerja-pekerja SME Technologies Sdn. Bhd.
 Kesatuan Pekerja-pekerja Acrylic Textiles of Malaysia Sdn. Bhd.
 Kesatuan Pekerja-pekerja Amalgamated Parts Manufacturers Sdn. Bhd.
 Kesatuan Pekerja-pekerja APM Shock Absorbers
 Kesatuan Pekerja-pekerja Auto Parts Manufacturing (Seats & Radiators)
 Kesatuan Pekerja-pekerja Central Sugar Refinery
 Kesatuan Pekerja-pekerja Fujikura Federal Cable
 Kesatuan Pekerja-pekerja Gula Padang Terap Bhd.
 Kesatuan Pekerja-pekerja Harris Advanced Technology (M) Sdn. Bhd.
 Kesatuan Pekerja-pekerja Kian Joo
 Kesatuan Pekerja-pekerja Kilang Gula Felda Perlis Sdn. Bhd.
 Kesatuan Pekerja-pekerja Lucas Automotive Sdn. Bhd., Senai
 Kesatuan Pekerja-pekerja Malay-Sino Chemical
 Kesatuan Pekerja-pekerja Nippon Electric Glass (M) Sdn. Bhd.
 Kesatuan Pekerja-pekerja Perusahaan Kumpulan United Motor Works
 Kesatuan Pekerja-pekerja Perusahaan Membuat Tekstil dan Pakaian Perak
 Kesatuan Pekerja-pekerja Pewter Kraftangan
 Kesatuan Pekerja-pekerja Syarikat Gummi Metall Teknik (M) Sdn. Bhd.
 Kesatuan Pekerja-pekerja Sime Tyres International Malaysia Sdn. Bhd.
 Kesatuan Pekerja-pekerja Tamura Electronics (M) Sdn. Bhd.
 Kesatuan Pekerja-pekerja Perusahaan Membuat Tekstil dan Pakaian Pulau Pinang dan Seberang Perai
 Machinery Manufacturing Employees' Union
 Malayan Sugar Manufacturing Employees' Union
 Metal Industries Employees' Union
 Motor Assemblers Supervisory Staff Union Peninsular Malaysia
 National Union of Drinks Manufacturing Industry Workers
 National Union of Employees in Companies Manufacturing Rubber Products
 National Union of Industrial Mineral Smelting Workers
 National Union of Petroleum and Chemical Industry Workers
 National Union of Tobacco Workers
 National Union of Transport Equipment Allied Industry Workers
 National Union of Workers in the Shoe Manufacturing Industry
 Non-Metallic Mineral Products Manufacturing Employees' Union
 Negeri Sembilan and Malacca Textile and Garment Workers Union
 Paper and Paper Products Manufacturing Employees' Union
 Printing Industry Employees' Union
 British American Tobacco Employees' Union, Malaysia
 Selangor and Federal Territory Textile Workers Union
 Union of Beverage Industry Workers
 Union of Malayawata Steel Workers
 Kesatuan Pekerja-pekerja Nippon Elec (M) Sdn. Bhd.
 Kesatuan Pekerja-pekerja Time Reach Sdn. Bhd.
 Kesatuan Pekerja-pekerja Epson Precision (M) Sdn. Bhd.
 Kesatuan Kakitangan C.G.E. Utilities (M) Sdn. Bhd.
 Kesatuan Pekerja-pekerja Kami Electronics Industry (M) Sdn. Bhd.
 Kesatuan Pekerja-pekerja Perodua Engine Manufacturing Sdn. Bhd.
 Kesatuan Pekerja-pekerja Hokuden (M) Sdn. Bhd
 Kesatuan Pekerja-pekerja Casio (M) Sdn. Bhd.
 Kesatuan Kakitangan Petroleum Nasional Bhd (Petronas Sabah)
 Kesatuan Pekerja Shell MDS (M) Sdn. Bhd. Sarawak
 Kesatuan Kakitangan Percetakan Nasional Malaysia Bhd. Sarawak
 Kesatuan Pekerja-pekerja Sabah International Dairies Sdn. Bhd.
 Kesatuan Pekerja-pekerja Hitachi Consumer Products (M) Sdn. Bhd.
 Kesatuan Kakitangan Eksekutif Industri Makanan SM
 Beverage Industry Executive Staff Union
 Kesatuan Pekerja-pekerja Sabah International Dairies Sdn. Bhd.
 Kesatuan Pekerja-pekerja Exxonmobil Exploration and Production Malaysia Inc.
 Kesatuan Pekerja-pekerja Flextronics Manufacturing (M) Sdn. Bhd.
 Kesatuan Pekerja-pekerja Perkayuan Semenanjung Malaysia
 Kesatuan Pekerja-pekerja Qimonda Malaysia Sdn. Bhd.

Transport and Communications
 Brooke Dockyard & Engineering Works Corporation Employees Union, Sarawak
 Kesatuan Kakitangan Klang Container Terminal Sdn. Bhd.
 Kesatuan Pekerja-pekerja Airod Sdn. Bhd.
 Kesatuan Pekerja-pekerja Johor Port Bhd.
 Kesatuan Pekerja-pekerja Limbongan Kapal
 Kesatuan Pekerja-pekerja Limbongan Timor
 Kesatuan Pekerja-pekerja M’sia Airports Bhd.
 Kesatuan Pekerja-pekerja Malaysia Airport Bhd. Sarawak
 Kesatuan Pekerja-pekerja MHS Aviation Sdn. Bhd. (Lapangan Terbang Kerteh – Kemaman)
 Kesatuan Pekerja-pekerja Naval Dockyard Sdn. Bhd.
 Kesatuan Pekerja-pekerja Pakaian Seragam Pos
 Kesatuan Pekerja-pekerja Pelabuhan Klang Port Management Sdn. Bhd.
 Kesatuan Pekerja-pekerja Pengkalan Bekalan Kemaman Sdn. Bhd.
 Kesatuan Pekerja-pekerja Perbadanan Perkapalan Antarabangsa Malaysia Berhad (MISC) Semenanjung Malaysia
 Kesatuan Pekerja-pekerja Perkeranian Pos Malaysia Berhad
 Kesatuan Pekerja-pekerja Projek Lebuhraya Utara Selatan (PLUS)
 Kesatuan Penyelia-penyelia Projek Lebuhraya Utara Selatan Bhd.
 Kesatuan Sekerja Kakitangan Sistem Televisyen (M) Bhd.
 Klang Port Management Staff Union
 Malaysian Airlines System Employees’ Union Peninsular Malaysia
 MAS Executive Staff Association
 National Union of Newspaper Workers
 National Union of Telekoms Employees
 Penang Port Workers Union
 Persatuan Pegawai-Pegawai Kanan Lembaga Pelabuhan Klang
 Pos Malaysia Berhad Clerical Staff Union, Sabah
 Railwaymen’s Union of Malaya
 Rajang Port Authority Employees Union
 Redifussion Workers Union Of Malaya
 Sabah Port Authority Workers Union
 Transport Workers Union
 Union of Employees in Port Ancillary Services Suppliers
 Kesatuan Pekerja-pekerja Telekom Malaysia Bhd. Sabah
 MHS Aviation Sdn. Bhd. Employees’ Union Sarawak
 Kesatuan Pegawai-pegawai Kanan Penang Port Sdn. Bhd.
 Persatuan Pegawai Keselamatan Bukan Eksekutif Kuantan Port Consortium Sdn. Bhd.
 Kesatuan Pekerja-pekerja Telekom Malaysia Bhd. Sabah
 Kesatuan Pekerja Telekom Malaysia Berhad Sarawak
 Persatuan Eksekutif Pos Malaysia
 Kesatuan Pekerja–pekerja Lembaga Pelabuhan Kuching
 Persatuan Kakitangan Eksekutif Sistem Penerbangan Malaysia (KK)
 Kesatuan Eksekutif Utusan Melayu (M) Bhd.
 Airlines Workers Union, Sarawak
 Kesatuan Pekerja-pekerja Malaysia Airports Bhd. Wilayah Sabah
 Kesatuan Eksekutif Airod Sdn. Bhd.
 Kesatuan Sekerja Kakitangan Bintulu Port Sdn. Bhd.
 Kesatuan Kakitangan Eksekutif MISC Bhd.
 Kuching Port Authority Employees’ Union
 Sabah Executive Staff Association of Malaysia Airlines
 Kesatuan Pelaut Sabah

Services
 Club Employees Union, Peninsular Malaysia
 Commonwealth Services Employees Union
 Concorde Hotel Employees Union
 Kesatuan Kakitangan Am Kolej Tunku Abdul Rahman
 Kesatuan Pekerja-pekerja Pens Travelodge Kangar
 Kesatuan Pekerja-pekerja Hotel Sarawak
 Kesatuan Pekerja-pekerja Parkroyal Kuala Lumpur
 Kesatuan Pekerja-pekerja Safeguards Corporation Berhad
 Kesatuan Pekerja-pekerja Securicor (M)
 Kesatuan Pekerja-pekerja Securicor (M) Sdn. Bhd. Sabah
 Kesatuan Pekerja-pekerja Securicor Sarawak
 Kesatuan Pengawal-pengawal Keselamatan Malayan Banking
 National Union of Hotel, Bar & Restaurant Workers, Peninsular Malaysia
 National Union of Race Horse Syces Pen
 National Union of Teachers in Independent Schools
 Penang Turf Club Race Day Workers Union
 Resort World Bhd. Executive Union
 Resort World Employees Union
 Sarawak Medical Services Union
 Union of Employees in Private Medical Health Services
 Union of Employees in Trade Unions
 Sarawak Club Employee’s Union
 Kesatuan Pekerja-pekerja B. Braun Medical Industries Sdn. Bhd.
 Kesatuan Kebangsaan Kakitangan Akademik Institusi Pengajian Tinggi
 Kesatuan Pekerja-pekerja Zetavest Sdn. Bhd.
 Kesatuan Eksekutif Angkatan Koperasi Kebangsaan Malaysia Bhd.
 Sabah Hotel, Resort & Restautant Employees Union
 Kesatuan Pekerja-pekerja Alam Flora Sdn. Bhd.
 Kesatuan Pekerja-pekerja LSG Sky Chefts-Brahim’s Sdn. Bhd.

Government Services
 Amalgamated Union of Employees in Government Clerical and Allied Services
 Employees Provident Fund Board Staff Union
 Kuala Lumpur City Council Workers Union
 Kesatuan Kakitangan Am Universiti Putra Malaysia
 Kesatuan Kakitangan Kumpulan Wang Simpanan Pekerja Sarawak
 Kesatuan Kakitangan Lembaga Pasaran dan Pelesen Getah Malaysia, Semenanjung Malaysia
 Kesatuan Kakitangan Lembaga Urusan dan Tabung Haji
 Kesatuan Kakitangan Lembaga Pembangunan Pelaburan Malaysia (MIDA)
 Kesatuan Kebangsaan Pembantu Tadbir Kesihatan Semenanjung Malaysia
 Kesatuan Pegawai-pegawai Hasil Dalam Negeri
 Kesatuan Pegawai-pegawai Majlis Amanah Rakyat (MARA)
 Kesatuan Pekerja pekerja Jabatan Cetak Kerajaan
 Kesatuan Pekerja-pekerja Jabatan Kebajikan Masyarakat Malaysia Semenanjung Malaysia (KIKMAS)
 Kesatuan Pekerja-pekerja Koperasi Polis Diraja Malaysia Bhd.
 Kesatuan Pekerja-pekerja Perbadanan Kemajuan Pelancongan Malaysia
 Kesatuan Pekerja-pekerja Perbadanan Pembangunan Bandar Malaysia (UDA)
 Kesatuan Pekerja-pekerja Zoo Negara/Akuarium Tunku Abdul Rahman
 Kesatuan Sekerja Anggota Kumpulan Wang Simpanan Sabah
 Kesatuan Sekerja Kakitangan Kemajuan Pahang Tenggara (DARA)
 Kesatuan Sekerja Kakitangan Majlis Perbandaran Tawau
 Malayan Nurses Union
 Malayan Technical Services Union
 Malaysian Rubber Board Staff Union
 National Union of Public Works Department Employees
 National Union of the Teaching Profession
 Penang Municipal Services Union
 Sabah Electricity Board Employees Union
 Sabah Medical Services Union
 Senior Officers Association University Hospital
 University Hospital Staff Union
 University of Malaya General Staff Union
 Kesatuan Kakitangan Perbadanan Hal Ehwal Bekas Angkatan Tentera
 Sabah Inland Revenue Employee’s Union

See also

Trade unions in Malaysia

References

External links
 

Trade unions in Malaysia
International Trade Union Confederation
Trade unions established in 1949